Crown of thorns was worn by Jesus of Nazareth during the Passion.

Crown of Thorns may also refer to:

Biology and botany
 Crown-of-thorns starfish
 Euphorbia milii (Euphorbiaceae), a species of spurge
 Koeberlinia (Koeberliniaceae), a species of shrub
 Paliurus spina-christi (Rhamnaceae), also known as Christ's Thorn or Jerusalem Thorn
 See also: Gundelia tournefortii (a thistle-like plant)

Music
 Crown of Thorns (band), early-1980s American post-punk band
 Crown of Thorns (album), an album by Rakaa, a member of the Dilated Peoples
 The Crown (band), Swedish death metal band formerly known as Crown of Thorns
 "Chloe Dancer/Crown of Thorns", a 1990 song by Mother Love Bone
 "Crown of Thorns" (Clark Datchler song), 1990
 "Thorn of Crowns", a song by Echo & the Bunnymen from the 1984 album Ocean Rain
 "Crown of Thorns", a song by Social Distortion from the album White Light, White Heat, White Trash
 "Crown of Thorns", a song by Erasure from the album Wild!
 "Crown of Thorns", a song by Black Veil Brides from the album Black Veil Brides (album)

Other
 Crown of Thorns' Church, an Anglican church in Hong Kong Sheng Kung Hui
 Crown of Thorns (woodworking), a technique of self-supported interlocking pieces
 "Crown of Thorns" (short story), a short story by Poppy Z. Brite